Ricardo Verduguez (born July 28, 1989) is a Bolivian football defender. He currently plays for Universitario de Sucre.

Club career
Verduguez started his career at the amateur level with Tahuichi Academy. In 2005, he made his debut in first division football with hometown club Blooming at only 16 years of age.

Scouts from Europe are keeping an eye on Verduguez because of the potential he has shown. He has been likened to attacking Brazilian full-backs Cafu and Roberto Carlos, indicating that he may have a big future in football.

International career
Thanks to his impressive displays and good form he played for Bolivia U21 in the 2007 South American U-20 Championship held in Paraguay, and again during the 2009 version of the tournament hosted by Venezuela. He made his debut with the senior Bolivia national team on October 17, 2007 against Colombia for the 2010 World Cup qualification round in La Paz.

Club titles

External links
CONMEBOL

1989 births
Living people
Sportspeople from Santa Cruz de la Sierra
Bolivian footballers
Bolivia international footballers
Association football midfielders
Club Blooming players
Guabirá players
Club San José players
Nacional Potosí players
C.D. Jorge Wilstermann players
Universitario de Sucre footballers
Bolivian Primera División players